Oberkassel Nord is a station served by line 66 of the Bonn Stadtbahn and line 62 of Bonn's tram system. This station consists of two tracks with two side platforms. The Bonn-Oberkassel station is about 450 meters away.

References

External links

Cologne-Bonn Stadtbahn stations
Bonn Straßenbahn stations